Combe Hill may refer to:

 Combe Hill, East Sussex, a causewayed enclosure, near Eastbourne in East Sussex, UK
 Combe Hill, Berkshire, a summit on the North Hampshire Downs in Berkshire, UK